Stephanie Nesbitt (born 10 August 1985) is a Canadian-born American competitor in synchronized swimming.

She won an Olympic bronze medal at the 2004 Summer Olympics, in the team competition.

Personal life
Nesbitt was born in Toronto, Canada, on 10 August 1985. Stephanie's mother is synchronized swimming champion and coach Sue Baross Nesbitt.  Her younger sister is Barbara Nesbitt, who is also a synchronized swimmer and trainer.

Career

Stephanie began swimming with the Riverside AQuettes in Riverside, CA, as a child.  In 1994, she took first place in the Junior National Duet Champion with fellow Riverside AQuettes team member Courtenay Stewart.  In 2002, she placed second in the duet competition with Sara Lowe at the VIII Junior World Championships in Montreal, and was a member of the USA Team that came in 3rd place at the X FINA World Cup in Zurich, Switzerland.  She was a member of the USA Team that placed 3rd overall and in Free Routine Combination at the X World Aquatic Championships in Barcelona, Spain, in 2003, before she went on to participate with the team that took first at the XIV Pan American Games in Santo Domingo, Dominican Republic. At the XXVIII Olympic Games in Athens, Greece, she was part of Team USA, which took the bronze.

Along with the rest of the U.S. 2004 Olympic Team for Synchronized Swimming, Stephanie was a U.S.S.S. Athlete of the Year, a U.S.O.C. Sportswoman of the Year, and nominated for the James E. Sullivan Award.

References

1985 births
Living people
Olympic bronze medalists for the United States in synchronized swimming
American synchronized swimmers
Synchronized swimmers at the 2004 Summer Olympics
Swimmers from Toronto
Medalists at the 2004 Summer Olympics